Louis Bessière (born 2 September 1902) was a French cyclist. He competed in the individual and team road race events at the 1928 Summer Olympics.

References

External links
 

1902 births
Year of death missing
French male cyclists
Olympic cyclists of France
Cyclists at the 1928 Summer Olympics
Place of birth missing